Torkasheh (also Romanized as Torkāsheh) is a village in Behi Dehbokri Rural District, Simmineh District, Bukan County, West Azerbaijan Province, Iran. At the 2006 census, its population was 295, in 64 families.

References 

Populated places in Bukan County